Siebe Schrijvers (born 18 July 1996) is a Belgian footballer who currently plays for Oud-Heverlee Leuven. He plays as a midfielder.

Career
On 6 December 2012, he made his debut for Genk in the UEFA Europa League against FC Basel. His league debut came on the final day of the 2012–2013 season against Club Brugge replacing the injured Benjamin De Ceulaer at half-time. He scored his first league goal at 19 October 2013 against Lierse S.K.

In June 2018, it was announced Schrijvers would join Club Brugge for the 2018–19 season having agreed a four-year contract until 2022. The transfer fee paid to Genk was reported as €3 million.

Career statistics

Club

Notes

Honours
Club Brugge
 Belgian Super Cup: 2018

References

External links

1996 births
Living people
Association football forwards
Belgian footballers
K.R.C. Genk players
S.K. Beveren players
Club Brugge KV players
Oud-Heverlee Leuven players
Belgian Pro League players
Belgium youth international footballers
Belgium under-21 international footballers
People from Lommel
Footballers from Limburg (Belgium)